Data Sitchinava (born 21 March 1989) is a Georgian professional footballer. 

He was a top goalscorer for Sioni Bolnisi in 2021 with 20 goals, largely contributing to the team's promotion to the top flight. Moreover, this season he was named the best player of the last quarter (Round 28–36). 

Sitchinava has been a member of Kolkheti-1913 squad since February 2022.

References

External links 
 
 
 Profile at Dinamo Brest website

1989 births
Living people
Footballers from Georgia (country)
Association football midfielders
Expatriate footballers from Georgia (country)
FC Kolkheti-1913 Poti players
FC Gagra players
FC Dinamo Batumi players
FC Dynamo Brest players
FC Sioni Bolnisi players
FC Torpedo Kutaisi players
FC Metalurgi Rustavi players
FC Merani Martvili players
FC Spartaki Tskhinvali players
FC Zugdidi players
Erovnuli Liga players
Erovnuli Liga 2 players
Belarusian Premier League players
Expatriate sportspeople from Georgia (country) in Belarus
Expatriate footballers in Belarus